General elections were held in Japan on 10 August 1898.

Results

Notes

References

1898 08
1898 elections in Japan
Japan
August 1898 events
1898